The 2020 Italian F4 Championship Powered by Abarth was the seventh season of the Italian F4 Championship. Gabriele Minì won the drivers' championship in his rookie season while his team Prema Powerteam won the teams' championship for the fifth time.

Teams and drivers

Race calendar and results

The calendar was revealed on 16 September 2019. Following a delayed start to the season due to the 2019-20 coronavirus pandemic, a new calendar was announced on 19 May 2020. On 3 June 2020 it was announced that the season opener at Hungaroring was pushed back 2 weeks. The final calendar was released on 11 June 2020, with Hungaroring no longer on the schedule.

Championship standings 
Points were awarded to the top 10 classified finishers in each race. No points were awarded for pole position or fastest lap. The final classifications for the drivers' and rookies' standings were obtained by summing up the scores on the 16 best results obtained during the races held.

Drivers' championship

Secondary Classes' standings

Teams' championship 
Each team acquired the points earned by their two best drivers in each race.

Notes

References

External links

ACI Sport page

Italian F4 Championship seasons
Italian
F4 Championship
Italian F4
Italian F4